Great Pianists of the 20th Century – Martha Argerich is the second volume of the Great Pianists of the 20th Century box set and is the first of two volumes dedicated to her. The album features music by the composers Johann Sebastian Bach, Franz Liszt, Sergei Prokofiev, Sergei Rachmaninoff, and Maurice Ravel. The works were recorded between 1967 and 1982.

Featured works

Franz Liszt 

Piano Concerto No. 1 in E flat major, S. 124±

Maurice Ravel 
Piano Concerto in G major±±
Sonatine
Gaspard de la nuit

Sergei Rachmaninoff 
Piano Concerto No. 3 in D minor, Op. 30±±±

Johann Sebastian Bach 
Partita No. 2 in C minor, BWV 826

Sergei Prokofiev 
Piano Concerto No. 3 in C major, Op. 26±±
±  London Symphony Orchestra conducted by Claudio Abbado
±± Berliner Philharmoniker conducted by Claudio Abbado
±±± RSO Berlin conducted by Riccardo Chailly

Track listing

Disc 1

 Liszt: Piano Concerto No. 1 In E Flat, S. 124:
    1:  "Allegro maestoso" – 5:08
    2a: "Quasi adagio" – 4:23
    2b: "Allegretto vivace - Allegro animato" – 4:03
    3:  "Allegro marziale animato" - 4:01

 Ravel: Piano Concerto in G major
    1:  "Allegramente" – 8:11
    2:  "Allegro assai" – 9:02
    3:  "Presto" – 3:55
 Rachmaninoff: Piano Concerto No. 3 in D minor, Op. 30
    1:  "Allegro ma non tanto" – 15:26
    2:  "Intermezzo. Adagio" – 11:00
    3:  "Finale. Alla breve" – 13:53

Disc 2
J.S.Bach: Partita No. 2 in C minor, BWV 826
  1  "Sinfona. Grave adagio – Andante" – 4:15
  2  "Allemande" – 4:18
  3  "Courante" – 2:08
  4  "Sarabande" – 3:54
  5  "Rondeaux" – 1:17
  6  "Capriccio" – 3:06
Ravel: Sonatine
  1  "Modéré" – 3:59
  2  "Mouvement de menuet" – 3:01
  3  "Animé" – 3:37
Ravel: Gaspard de la nuit
  1  "Ondine" – 6:19
  2  "Le gibet" – 6:42
  3  "Scarbo" – 9:18
Prokofiev: Concerto No. 3 In C, Op. 26
  1  "Andante – Allegro" – 9:00
  2  "Tema con variazione" – 9:03
  3  "Allegro ma non troppo" – 9:03

1999 classical albums
1999 compilation albums